Edward Hazen Thomas (9 August 1898 – 8 May 1965) was an Australian rules football player at the Melbourne Football Club in the Victorian Football League (VFL).

In 1926, he became one of the club's premiership players, under the auspices of captain-coach Albert Chadwick. Thomas made his debut against  in round 1 of the 1921 VFL season, at the East Melbourne Cricket Ground. He has been given the Melbourne Heritage Number of 385, based on the order of his debut for the club.  Originally from Oakleigh Football Club in the Victorian Football Association (VFA), he returned there for the 1929, 1930 and 1931 seasons before returning to Melbourne for a final season in the VFL.

References

External links

 
 
Demonwiki profile

1898 births
1965 deaths
Melbourne Football Club players
Oakleigh Football Club players
Australian rules footballers from Victoria (Australia)
Yarrawonga Football Club players
Melbourne Football Club Premiership players
One-time VFL/AFL Premiership players